Jair Pereira da Silva (born 29 May 1946), commonly referred to as  Jair Pereira, is a football manager and former player. He played as a midfielder.

Honours

Player 
 1973 - Campeonato Pernambucano (Santa Cruz)
 1974 - Campeonato Brasileiro Série A (Vasco da Gama)
 1977 - Taça Guanabara (Vasco da Gama)
 1977 - Campeonato Carioca (Vasco da Gama)
 1977 - Taça Guanabara (Vasco da Gama)

Manager 
 1982 - Campeonato Brasileiro Serie B (Campo Grande)
 1982 - Campeonato Paraense (Paysandu)
 1983 - South American Youth Championship (Brazil U-20)
 1983 - FIFA World Youth Championship (Brazil U-20)
 1987 - Campeonato Mineiro (Cruzeiro)
 1988 - Campeonato Paulista (Corinthians)
 1989 - Campeonato Mineiro (Atlético Mineiro)
 1990 - Copa do Brasil (Flamengo)
 1991 -Campeonato Mineiro (Cruzeiro)
 1992 - Copa del Rey (Atlético Madrid) 
 1992 - Supercopa Libertadores (Cruzeiro)
 1994 - Campeonato Carioca (Vasco da Gama)
 2000 - Copa Sul-Minas (América Mineiro)
 2001 - Campeonato Mineiro (América Mineiro)
 2006 - Campeonato Cearense (Fortaleza)

References

External links
 

1946 births
Living people
Footballers from Rio de Janeiro (city)
Brazilian footballers
Association football midfielders
Brazilian football managers
Brazilian expatriate football managers
Campeonato Brasileiro Série A managers
La Liga managers
Campeonato Brasileiro Série B managers
Expatriate football managers in Spain
Brazilian expatriate sportspeople in Spain
Expatriate football managers in Paraguay
Brazilian expatriate sportspeople in Paraguay
Expatriate football managers in Saudi Arabia
Brazilian expatriate sportspeople in Saudi Arabia
Madureira Esporte Clube players
CR Flamengo footballers
Bonsucesso Futebol Clube players
Olaria Atlético Clube players
Santa Cruz Futebol Clube players
CR Vasco da Gama players
Bangu Atlético Clube players
Campo Grande Atlético Clube managers
Associação Atlética Ponte Preta managers
Paysandu Sport Club managers
Brazil national under-20 football team managers
America Football Club (RJ) managers
Al Shabab FC (Riyadh) managers
Al Jazira Club managers
Cruzeiro Esporte Clube managers
Sport Club Corinthians Paulista managers
Botafogo de Futebol e Regatas managers
Clube Atlético Mineiro managers
Sociedade Esportiva Palmeiras managers
CR Flamengo managers
Atlético Madrid managers
CR Vasco da Gama managers
Fluminense FC managers
Clube Atlético Bragantino managers
Club Athletico Paranaense managers
Esporte Clube Bahia managers
Cerro Porteño managers
Coritiba Foot Ball Club managers
América Futebol Clube (MG) managers
Sport Club do Recife managers
Avaí FC managers
Ceará Sporting Club managers
Fortaleza Esporte Clube managers
Associação Desportiva Cabofriense managers
Mesquita Futebol Clube managers
Itumbiara Esporte Clube managers